Janet Kigusiuq (b. 1926 Putuqsuqniq camp, near Garry Lake, Nunavut; d. 2005 Baker Lake, Nunavut) was an Inuit artist. Kigusiuq came from a large family of artists: she was the eldest daughter of Jessie Oonark, her siblings included artists Victoria Mamnguqsualuk, Nancy Pukingrnak, Peggy Qablunaaq Aittauq, Mary Yuusipik Singaqti, Josiah Nuilaalik, Miriam Marealik Qiyuk, and William Noah, and she was married to Mark Uqayuittuq, son of Luke Anguhadluq, themselves both artists.

Work 
Kigusiuq's bright, bold and graphic work focused on camp life activities like hunting and fishing and supernatural forms inspired by Inuit spirituality and stories. The source of these motifs are principally drawn from childhood experiences at the family camp, Kitikat in the Back River region.

Throughout her career she experimented with many artistic mediums, including drawing, print, textiles, wall hangings. She adopted printmaking following the family's move to Baker Lake and between 1970 and 1988 she contributed to the Baker Lake print collections. Her mature work saw the development of pencil crayon colour fields and collage techniques, the latter prompted by the onset of arthritis.

Selected exhibitions 

 Janet Kigusiuq: Recent Drawings. 1996. Winnipeg Art Gallery, Winnipeg, MB.
 The Urge to Abstraction: The Graphic Art of Janet Kigusiuq. 2008, Museum of Inuit Art. 
 New Lines: Contemporary Drawings from the National Gallery of Canada. June - Oct 2014. Art Gallery of Alberta
 Janet Kigusiuq. June 8 - September 26, 2019, The Art Gallery of Ontario. 
 Breaking Ground: Freda Diesing, Helen Kalvak, Janet Kigusiuq, Rita Letendre. September–November 2019. National Arts Centre.

Collections 
Her work can be found in a number of museum and gallery permanent collections such as:

 The National Gallery of Canada in Ottawa, ON
 The Macdonald Steward Art Centre, Guelph, ON
 The Museum of Inuit Art in Toronto, ON
 The Winnipeg Art Gallery in Winnipeg, MB.
 The Musée national des beaux-arts du Québec in Quebec City, Quebec
Feheley Fine Arts in Toronto, ON

References

Bibliography

Further reading
 
 
 
 
 Janet Kigusiuq at Inuit Art Alive
 Janet Kigusiuq at the Canadian Art Database

1926 births
2005 deaths
Inuit artists
Artists from Nunavut
Canadian illustrators
Canadian women illustrators
20th-century Canadian printmakers
Canadian Inuit women
20th-century Canadian women artists
Women printmakers
20th-century printmakers
20th-century Canadian artists
Inuit from the Northwest Territories
Inuit from Nunavut
People from Baker Lake
Oonark family